Blatný (feminine Blatná) is a Czech surname. Notable people include:

 František Blatný, Czech chess player, international chess referee and chess coach
 Jan Blatný, Czech physician and politician
 Ivan Blatný, Czech poet 
 Lev Blatný, Czech poet
 Pavel Blatný, Czech chess player
 Zdeněk Blatný, Czech ice hockey player

See also
 Blatná, a town in South Bohemia

Czech-language surnames